Tourist is a 2021 Russian war film and action film directed by Andrey Batov. According to Matthew Campbell, writing in The Times, it is a "most  eye-catching piece of propaganda", which glorifies the men of the Wagner Group, a mercenary force supported by Yevgeny Prigozhin, who sponsored the film. It was released in Russia on May 19, 2021. Dubbed in Sango, the film was presented to a sold-out stadium in Bangui, the capital of the Central African Republic in 2021.

The story revolves around a group of Russian instructors visiting the Central African Republic with former police officer Grisha Dmitriev who end up fighting with bandits.
The film debuted at the Barthélemy Boganda stadium in Bangui. The film was filmed in March and April in 2021.

Plot 
The film tells about Russian instructors who work in the Central African Republic and train the military of this country. Presidential and parliamentary elections are approaching and this aggravates the situation in the country. Former President François Bozizé, who was barred from the elections, decides to illegally mobilize the military. Meanwhile, the rebels unite to carry out a coup d'état.

Cast

References

External links 
 

2021 films
2020s Russian-language films
Russian action war films
2020s action war films
Wagner Group